Broad Creek in Prince George's County was the first footprint of European settlement in the immediate counties around what would become the nation's capital, Washington, D.C. The area is part of greater Fort Washington.

The area was settled by Europeans in the 1660s and the town was created in 1706 when the colonial Maryland Legislature authorized surveying and laying out the towns of Queen Anne Town, Nottingham, Mill Town, Piscataway, Aire (also known as Broad Creek) and Upper Marlboro (then known as Marlborough Town).

In 1747, the legislature tried to improve the quality and the method of marketing tobacco, then the major crop of the area, and established a formal system of tobacco inspection and quality control. The town was home to one of seven state tobacco warehouses built in Prince George's County.

Today, this "first footprint" of settlement in the capital area is a Prince George's County Historic District, with three 17th century homesites and an 18th-century Episcopal Church structure. The Broad Creek Historic District comprises  along the Potomac River, and is remarkable for its environmental resources, as well as its 12,000-year-old Indian archeological discoveries.

It was placed on the National Register of Historic Places  on December 8, 2011.

Broad Creek and Henson Creek
The stream named Broad Creek is a tributary of the Potomac River.  Henson Creek is a tributary of Broad Creek.   The 5.7 mile long Henson Creek Trail is managed by the Maryland-National Capital Park and Planning Commission.

References

External links
, including undated photo, at Maryland Historical Trust website

Geography of Prince George's County, Maryland
Unincorporated communities in Maryland
1706 establishments in Maryland
Historic districts in Prince George's County, Maryland
Historic districts on the National Register of Historic Places in Maryland
Historic American Buildings Survey in Maryland
Populated places established in 1706
National Register of Historic Places in Prince George's County, Maryland